Keith William Nolan (May 7, 1964 – February 19, 2009) was an American military historian, focusing on the various campaigns of the Vietnam War.  He was born in Webster Groves, Missouri; his father was a junior college history instructor who was also a Marine veteran. Nolan obtained a history degree from Webster University.  Keith Nolan died of lung cancer in February 2009 at the age of 44.

Bibliography

House to House:Playing the Enemy's Game in Saigon, 
Ripcord: Screaming Eagles Under Siege, Vietnam 1970, 
Battle for Saigon: Tet 1968, 
Sappers In The Wire (Texas A&M University Military History Series), 
A Hundred Miles of Bad Road (Dwight Birdwell, coauthor), 
The Magnificent Bastards: The Joint Army-Marine Defense of Dong Ha, 1968 , 
Operation Buffalo: USMC Fight for the DMZ, 
Into Cambodia, 1970: Spring Campaign, Summer Offensive, 
Into Laos: The Story of Dewey Canyon II/Lam Son 719, Vietnam 1971, 
Death Valley: The Summer Offensive, I Corps, August 1969, 
Battle for Hue: Tet 1968, 
The Battle for Saigon: Tet 1968, 
Search and Destroy: The Story of an Armored Cavalry Squadron in Vietnam,

References

1964 births
2009 deaths
People from Webster Groves, Missouri
Historians of the Vietnam War
Writers from Missouri
Webster University alumni
20th-century American historians
20th-century American male writers
American male non-fiction writers